Duntulm is a township on the most northerly point of the Trotternish peninsula of the Isle of Skye made up of Shulista (north Duntulm), south Duntulm and Ghlumaig.

History
Duntulm was originally a Pictish fortress, forming one of a chain of duns or forts stretching along the north coast of the Isle of Skye. On the arrival of the Norsemen the fort became the residence of a powerful Viking leader who gave it the name David's Fort.

Trotternish often changed hands. It was not until the 16th century that the Lords of the Isles finally seized the territory and Donhall Gorm (Blue Donald) the chief (great-grandson of Hugh of Sleat), took up residence there and carried out considerable improvements to the fort. In 1730 the MacDonalds moved away from Duntulm and stayed for a time at Monkstadt before building their new castle at Armadale.

Duntulm is home to a clach-ultaich, a lifting stone. It is said to weigh a ton.

Geography
The village is most notable for the coastal scenery coupled with the ruins of Duntulm Castle, from which there are views of the Outer Hebrides. The single-track A855 road from Uig takes travellers around to Staffin.

This north-west tip of Skye is remote but glorious and has earned praise from travellers and walkers for some time; the trek to Rubha Hunish.

Economy
Duntulm contains one hotel, directly facing the castle and the sea. There are also the Duntulm Coastguard Cottages nearby, and the dispersed settlements in the area offer alternative accommodations.

References

External links

Canmore - Skye, Cnoc A'Mhoid, Duntulm site record

Populated places in the Isle of Skye